2009–10 Albanian Cup was the fifty-eighth season of Albania's annual cup competition. It began on 23 September 2009 with the First Preliminary Round. The winners of the competition qualified for the second qualifying round of the UEFA Europa League. Flamurtari were the defending champions.

The rounds were played in a two-legged format similar to those of European competitions. If the aggregated score is tied after both games, the team with the higher number of away goals advances. If the number of away goals is equal in both games, the match is decided by extra time and a penalty shootout, if necessary.

Preliminary Tournament
In order to reduce the number of participating teams for the First Round to 32, a preliminary tournament was played. Only teams from the Kategoria e Dytë (third level) were allowed to enter. Each Kategoria e Dytë group played its own tournament. In contrast to the main tournament, the preliminary tournament was held as a single-leg knock-out competition.

First Preliminary Round
Games were played on 23 September 2009.

|}

Second Preliminary Round
Games were played on 30 September 2009.

|}

First round
All twenty-eight teams of the 2009–10 Superiore and Kategoria e Parë entered in this round, along with the four Second Preliminary Round winners. First legs were played on 21 October 2009 and the second legs were played on 4 November 2009.

|}

Notes
 1 The match was awarded to Teuta by 3–0 after Vlora did not secure their ground.

Second round
In this round enter the 16 winners from the previous round. The first legs took place on 25 November and the second legs took place on 10 December.

|}

Quarter-finals
In this round enter the 8 winners from the previous round. The games are scheduled as shown below.

|}

Semi-finals
In this round enter the four winners from the previous round.

|}

Final

References

External links
 Official website 
 Albanian Cup on rsssf.org

Cup
Albania
2009-10